is a stoneware ceramic type made in Fukuoka Prefecture.

History 
The Japanese ceramic known as Takatori ware was founded by Korean potters brought to Japan at the end of the sixteenth century in the Japanese invasions of Korea (1592–1598). From its founding until 1871, Takatori ware production was controlled and patronized by the Kuroda, lords of Chikuzen Province (now Fukuoka Prefecture). The earliest known kiln was built at the base of Mt. Takatori in Chikuzen between 1600 and 1606. Over the course of the seventeenth century, the site of Takatori production moved five times. In 1716, the workshop and kiln were moved to the Nishijin area west of the Kuroda castle at Fukuoka; there production remained until the abolition of the domain system in 1871. Later, probably in the nineteenth century, the Takatori style became known as one of the Seven Famous Kilns of Enshu, which made wares following the preferences of the tea ceremony master Kobori Enshū.

References

Further reading

External links 
 http://www.takatoriyaki.jp

Japanese pottery
Culture in Fukuoka Prefecture